Blas Armando Giunta Rodríguez (born 6 September 1963, in Buenos Aires) is an Argentine former footballer who played as a midfielder and current youth coach at Boca Juniors.

Career
Giunta started his playing career at Club Atlético San Lorenzo de Almagro where he played from 1983 through 1984 and then from 1986 to the end of 1988, there he took part in the famous Los Camboyanos ("The Cambodians") team. He ended his career as a player in 1999 playing for Defensores de Belgrano, playing in between in teams as Cipolleti de Río Negro (1984–1985), Platense (1985–1986), Murcia (España)(1988–1989), Boca Juniors (1989–1993), Toluca (México)(1993–1995), Ourense (España) (1997–1998). He is mostly remembered for his tenacious approach to football and the song Giunta, Giunta, Giunta, huevo, huevo, huevo sung in the stadiums.

He played almost 200 matches with Boca Juniors, and won the Supercopa Sudamericana 1989, Recopa Sudamericana 1990, Copa Masters 1992, and Apertura Championship 1992.

He won the Copa América in 1991 with Argentina's national team.

Honours

Managerial
 Primera B Metropolitana: Clausura 2007

External links

 
 
 Argentine Primera Statistics at Fútbol XXI  

1963 births
Living people
Argentine footballers
Argentina international footballers
1991 Copa América players
San Lorenzo de Almagro footballers
Club Atlético Platense footballers
Boca Juniors footballers
Defensores de Belgrano footballers
Deportivo Toluca F.C. players
Footballers from Buenos Aires
Argentine people of Italian descent
La Liga players
Real Murcia players
CD Ourense footballers
Argentine Primera División players
Liga MX players
Argentine expatriate footballers
Argentine expatriate sportspeople in Mexico
Argentine expatriate sportspeople in Spain
Expatriate footballers in Spain
Expatriate footballers in Mexico
Copa América-winning players
Association football midfielders
Argentine football managers
Estudiantes de Buenos Aires managers
Quilmes Atlético Club managers
Pan American Games bronze medalists for Argentina
Medalists at the 1987 Pan American Games
Footballers at the 1987 Pan American Games
Pan American Games medalists in football